Nathan Simeon (born February 14, 2000) is a Canadian soccer player who plays as a defender for the University of San Francisco and the San Francisco Glens.

Career 
Simeon began his career by accepting a scholarship to join Orlando City's Club Development Academy system at Montverde Academy for the 2018–19 season. He made 14 appearances in his debut year.

On March 30, 2019, Simeon signed an academy contract with Orlando City's USL reserve affiliate OCB and made his senior debut in the season opener later that day, a 3–1 loss to FC Tucson.

In July 2019, Simeon verbally committed to play NCAA Division I soccer at the University of San Francisco.

Simeon signed with USL League Two side San Francisco Glens in May 2022.

References

External links 
 
 

2000 births
Living people
Canadian soccer players
Canadian expatriate soccer players
Canadian expatriates in the United States
Association football defenders
Expatriate soccer players in the United States
Orlando City B players
Soccer players from Montreal
USL League One players
San Francisco Dons men's soccer players